West Kootenay was a provincial electoral district in the Canadian province of British Columbia.  It was formed along with East Kootenay from a redistribution of the old Kootenay riding, which was one of the province's original twelve.

Demographics

Geography

History
The West Kootenay riding appeared as such only in the 1890 election.  In 1894, due to a surge in population related to the "silver rush" in the Kootenays, the riding was redistributed into:

West Kootenay (north riding)
West Kootenay (south riding)

In 1898, the West Kootenay north and south ridings were further redistributed into four ridings:

West Kootenay-Nelson, a provincial district from 1898 to 1903
West Kootenay-Revelstoke, a provincial district from 1898 to 1903
West Kootenay-Rossland, a provincial district from 1898 to 1903
West Kootenay-Slocan, a provincial district from 1898 to 1903

Members of Legislative Assembly

Election results 
NOTE:  Winners of each election are in bold

|-

|Independent
|James M. Kellie
|align="right"|46 	
|align="right"|29.49%
|align="right"|
|align="right"|unknown
|- bgcolor="white"
!align="right" colspan=3|Total valid votes
!align="right"|156
!align="right"|100.00%
!align="right"|
|- bgcolor="white"
!align="right" colspan=3|Total rejected ballots
!align="right"|
!align="right"|
!align="right"|
|- bgcolor="white"
!align="right" colspan=3|Turnout
!align="right"|%
!align="right"|
!align="right"|
|}

Sources 
Elections BC Historical Returns 1871-1986

Former provincial electoral districts of British Columbia
West Kootenay